The 2014 Voronin Cup  took place on December 16–17 in Moscow, Russia.

Medal winners

Senior Result

All-Around

Vault

Uneven Bars

Balance Beam

Floor Exercise

Junior Result

All-Around

Vault

Uneven Bars

Balance Beam

Floor Exercise

External links
  Result Website

Voronin Cup
2014 in gymnastics
2014 in Russian sport
Sports competitions in Moscow
2014 in Moscow
December 2014 sports events in Russia